László Farkasházy (born 27 January 1968) is a Hungarian former professional footballer who played as a midfielder.

References

External links
 

Living people
1968 births
Hungarian footballers
Footballers from Budapest
Association football midfielders
Hungary international footballers
Bundesliga players
Budapesti VSC footballers
VfL Bochum players
Budapest Honvéd FC players
MTK Budapest FC players
Vasas SC players
Kecskeméti TE players
BKV Előre SC footballers
Hungarian expatriate footballers
Hungarian expatriate sportspeople in Germany
Expatriate footballers in Germany